"Make Me Lose Control" is a 1988 Billboard Hot 100 No. 3 hit single that was written and performed by the singer-songwriter Eric Carmen. It was co-written by Dean Pitchford.  It is one of two major hits written by the duo, the other being the 1984 song "Almost Paradise" by Mike Reno and Ann Wilson.

Released a few months after the success of "Hungry Eyes", Carmen's song from the film Dirty Dancing, which peaked at No. 4 on the Billboard Hot 100 chart, "Make Me Lose Control" also reached the Top 5 on the Hot 100, topping out at No. 3. On the Sales chart the song spent a week at No. 1, while on the Airplay chart it reached No. 4. It spent 13 weeks in the Top 40. In addition, "Make Me Lose Control" spent three weeks at No. 1 on the adult contemporary chart, the singer's second song to do so (following "Never Gonna Fall in Love Again" from 1976).

Background
Carmen stated in the liner notes to a compilation album that "Make Me Lose Control" was an "odd record because it was all by itself. The song wasn't part of an album, but it was an interesting experience to jump back into the studio with Jimmy Ienner after ten years". The B side was Carmen's original 1975 recording of his song which became a major hit in 1977 for Shaun Cassidy, "That's Rock 'n' Roll".

"Make Me Lose Control" did not originally appear on any of Carmen's studio albums; the song later surfaced on various "greatest hits" releases. In keeping with its nostalgic feel, richness of harmony and underlying yearning for the "sweet songs" of the 1950s and 1960s, references are made to four other songs from that era, and another from the 1970s: "Uptown" (whether the song recorded by Roy Orbison or the one recorded by the Crystals is unclear), "Stand by Me" by Ben E. King, "Be My Baby" by The Ronettes, "Back in My Arms Again" by the Supremes, and “I Go Crazy” by Paul Davis. Of the seven times Carmen's compositions have reached the Top 10, it is the only song that has been released by no other artist besides him.

Music video
The music video was produced by Paul Flattery and directed by Jim Yukich of FYI. It features Kid Leo, a radio personality who got his start in Cleveland, Carmen's hometown.  The video makes reference to the film American Graffiti by re-creating the scene in which the blonde in the white T-Bird (Suzanne Somers) tells Curt (Richard Dreyfuss) "I love you", and his near-misses with her thereafter.  In the video, a mysterious young blonde pulls up beside Carmen's car and tells him "I love you."  Like Dreyfuss' character, Carmen only sees a T-Bird in passing for the remainder of the video. Cast in the video was actress Annette Sinclair who had just been divorced from rock singer Bob Seger whom she had married in 1987.

Chart performance

Weekly singles charts

Year-end charts

Popular culture
It was featured in the Showtime TV series Dexter in a season one episode called "Shrink Wrap", being enthusiastically sung into a police trophy by Debra Morgan (Jennifer Carpenter), while she danced in her bra in front of a mirror.

References

External links
 Lyrics of this song
 

1988 singles
1988 songs
Eric Carmen songs
Songs written by Dean Pitchford
Songs written by Eric Carmen
Song recordings produced by Jimmy Ienner
Arista Records singles
1980s ballads